UCB Home Loans Corporation Ltd (from Union de Crédit pour le Bâtiment) is a specialist mortgage lender of Nationwide Building Society, working primarily through regulated intermediaries. UCBHL operated out of a single location in Sutton with over 300 employees, relocating to Bournemouth and merging with the Portman Building Society's The Mortgage Works in 2007 following Nationwide's merger with the Portman.

It ceased new lending on 31 October 2008, but continues to collect money from its customers at rates that are above average.

Existing customers of UCB Homeloans are paying a rate that is currently 4.99%+ above base rates.

External links
UCB Home Loans official website

References

Financial services companies of the United Kingdom
Companies based in the London Borough of Sutton
Companies based in Bournemouth
2008 disestablishments in England